Thomas Nettleton (1683–1742) was an English physician who carried out some of the earliest systematic programmes of smallpox inoculation and who went on to statistical investigation of the outcomes.

Little is known of Nettleton other than that he was a physician in Halifax Yorkshire. By 1722, Nettleton was aware of several early accounts of inoculation when a smallpox outbreak occurred in his area. He went on to inoculate at least sixty people and reported the results in 1724. However, it was only later that year that he considered the difference in mortality between those who had received the smallpox inoculation and those who had not. It was his letter to James Jurin that motivated Jurin himself to gather further data and perform his own analysis.

References

1683 births
1742 deaths
People from Halifax, West Yorkshire
18th-century English medical doctors
British public health doctors
Medical doctors from Yorkshire